15 (fifteen) is the natural number following 14 and preceding 16.

Mathematics 

15 is:
 A deficient number, a smooth number, a lucky number, a pernicious number, a bell number (i.e., the number of partitions for a set of size 4),  a pentatope number,  and a repdigit in binary (1111) and quaternary (33). In hexadecimal, and higher bases, it is represented as F.
 A triangular number, a hexagonal number, and a centered tetrahedral number.
 The number of partitions of 7. 
 The smallest number that can be factorized using Shor's quantum algorithm.
 The magic constant of the unique order-3 normal magic square.
 The number of supersingular primes. 

Furthermore,

 15 is one of two numbers within the teen numerical range (13-19) not to use a single-digit number in the prefix of its name (the first syllable preceding the teen suffix); instead, it uses the adjective form of five (fifth) as the prefix. The other such number is 13.
The first 15 superabundant numbers are the same as the first 15 colossally abundant numbers.
 In decimal, 15 contains the digits 1 and 5 and is the result of adding together the integers from 1 to 5 (1 + 2 + 3 + 4 + 5 = 15). The only other number with this property (in decimal) is 27.
 There are 15 truncatable primes that are both right-truncatable and left-truncatable: 
2, 3, 5, 7, 23, 37, 53, 73, 313, 317, 373, 797, 3137, 3797, 739397 
 There are 15 perfect matchings of the complete graph K6 and 15 rooted binary trees with four labeled leaves, both of these being among the types of objects counted by double factorials.
 With only two exceptions, all prime quadruplets enclose a multiple of 15, with 15 itself being enclosed by the quadruplet (11, 13, 17, 19).
 If a positive definite quadratic form with integer matrix represents all positive integers up to 15, then it represents all positive integers via the 15 and 290 theorems.
 There are 15 monohedral convex pentagonal tilings, with eight being edge-to-edge.
 There are 15 regular and semiregular tilings when infinite (improper) apeirogonal forms are counted: three are regular (with one self-dual), eight are semiregular (with one chiral), and four are apeirogonal (from a total of 8, in-which 4 are duplicates). 
 Full icosahedral symmetry contains 15 mirror planes (2-fold axes). Specifically, the symmetry order for both the regular icosahedron and regular dodecahedron (which is made of regular pentagons) is 120: equal to sum of the first 15 integers, and the factorial of 5, wherein the sum of the first 5 integers itself is 15. Expressed mathematically:
 There are 15 Archimedean solids and 15 Catalan solids when enantiomorphic forms are counted separately.
 There are 15 regular honeycombs in hyperbolic 3-space: four are compact, and 11 are paracompact.

Science 

 The atomic number of phosphorus.
 Group 15 of the periodic table are sometimes known as the pnictogens.
 15 Eunomia is the largest Eunomian asteroid in the inner asteroid belt.

Religion

Sunnism 
The Hanbali Sunni madhab states that the age of fifteen of a solar or lunar calendar is when one's taklif (obligation or responsibility) begins and is the stage whereby one has his deeds recorded.

Judaism 
 In the Hebrew numbering system, the number 15 is not written according to the usual method, with the letters that represent "10" and "5" (י-ה, yodh and heh), because those spell out one of the Jewish names of God. Instead, the date is written with the letters representing "9" and "6" (ט-ו, teth and vav)
 Passover begins on the 15th day of the Hebrew month of Nisan
 Sukkot begins on the 15th day of the Hebrew month of Tishrei
 Tu Bishvat is a Jewish holiday occurring on the 15th of the Hebrew month of Shevat

Modern use 
15 is designated as an emergency number in Pakistan, for mobile phones, similar to the international GSM emergency number 112; if 112 is used in Pakistan, then the call is routed to 15. 112 can be used in an emergency even if the phone is locked and does not have a SIM card in it.

Sports 
 In all four of the major Gaelic games—hurling, Gaelic football for men and women, and camogie—each team has 15 players on the field at any given time.
 In both major forms of gridiron football (American and Canadian), standard games are played in 15-minute quarters.
 In rugby union:
 Each team has 15 players on the field at any given time, unless one or more players are removed for a serious rules infraction.
 The jersey number 15 is worn by the starting fullback.
 In tennis, the number 15 represents the first point gained in a game.
 In NCAA Division I women's college basketball, teams are allowed to provide scholarships to no more than 15 players at any given time.
 In Australian rules football, games in the AFL Women's league consist of 15-minute quarters.
 The maximum number of players on an NBA team roster.
 On 17 December 2022, the Sydney Thunder were bowled out for just 15 runs in a loss to the Adelaide Strikers during the 2022–23 Big Bash League season. It is the lowest score ever recorded by any professional team in worldwide Twenty20 cricket history.

Age 15 

 The age of a quinceañera, a Latina girl celebrating her 15th birthday. Thus, Spanish bingo callers might refer to the number 15 as la niña bonita (the beautiful girl).
 The age for obtaining a driver's (or learner's) permit in certain jurisdictions, including some, where the legal age for a driver's license is 16.
 The minimum age for driving a moped in some countries.
 The age of criminal responsibility in various countries.
 In the UK, a minor can be sent to prison to await trial at the age of 15.
 In some countries, it is the legal age for sexual consent.
 In the UK, it is the legal age to watch a BBFC "15" rated film in a cinema or purchase a "15" rated film or video game.
 The drinking age in Ethiopia.
 The age of majority in Indonesia, Myanmar, Iran and Yemen.

Music 

 "Fifteen" is a song composed by Taylor Swift on her album Fearless

In other fields 
Fifteen is:
 The 15 puzzle.
 The number of minutes in one quarter of an hour; 15 minutes past or before an hour is often known as quarter past and quarter to, respectively.

See also 
 List of highways numbered 15

References

Further reading 
 Wells, D. The Penguin Dictionary of Curious and Interesting Numbers London: Penguin Group. (1987): 91–93

External links 

  – discussing hexadecimals
  – discussing the Celtic number as used in Lincolnshire

Integers